The Melanomyinae are a subfamily of Calliphoridae, or blow flies. According to Whitworth, the most distinguishing characteristic of this subfamily is its dull color; however, the biology is poorly known.

Selected genera
Adichosina
Angioneura
Eggisops
Gymnadichosia
Melanomya (= Opsodexia)
Melinda
Ochromelinda
Onesihoplisa
Paradichosia
Tricycleopsis
Zernyiella

References

Calliphoridae